Petr Tuček (born January 26, 1979) is a Czech former professional ice hockey goaltender.

Tuček played 74 games in the Czech Extraliga for HC Zlín and HC Znojemští Orli. He also played in the Slovak Extraliga for HK 36 Skalica from 2004 to 2006 and in the Ligue Magnus for Drakkars de Caen during the 2007–08 season.

References

External links

1979 births
Living people
Czech ice hockey goaltenders
Drakkars de Caen players
TuS Geretsried players
HC Havířov players
SHK Hodonín players
Czech expatriate ice hockey players in Slovakia
HC Kometa Brno players
HC Olomouc players
Orli Znojmo players
Piráti Chomutov players
LHK Jestřábi Prostějov players
HK 36 Skalica players
HC Slezan Opava players
PSG Berani Zlín players
Czech expatriate ice hockey players in Germany
Czech expatriate sportspeople in France
Expatriate ice hockey players in France